Mnesampela privata, the autumn gum moth, is a moth of the family Geometridae. The species was first described by Achille Guenée in 1858. It is found in most of Australia.

The wingspan is about 40 mm.

The larvae feed on Eucalyptus species and is considered a pest for Eucalyptus plantations.

References

Nacophorini